City and Hunslet is a ward in the metropolitan borough of the City of Leeds, West Yorkshire, England. It contains over 400 listed buildings that are recorded in the National Heritage List for England. Of these, eight are listed at Grade I, the highest of the three grades, 30 at Grade II*, the middle grade, and the others are at Grade II, the lowest grade.

Leeds is the largest city in Yorkshire, and has been a commercial centre since the 15th century. Its major industry has been textiles, especially wool, and later flax, the latter becoming a speciality of the city. Transport was provided by the Aire and Calder Navigation, begun in 1699, the Leeds and Liverpool Canal, opened in 1777, and the railways from the 1830s. The commercial centre developed to the north of the railway and river, with mills mainly around the river, and factories to the south of this producing machine parts for the mills, locomotives, and other items. This history is reflected by the listed buildings. The growing wealth of the area resulted in the building of Georgian houses and terraces in the later 18th and early 19th centuries, and this was following later in the 19th century by grand buildings housing offices, warehouses, banks and hotels. In due course impressive civic buildings, theatres and shopping arcades followed.

This list contains the listed buildings in the area to the north of the railway running from west to east on the south of the centre of the city. The area is mainly commercial, retail and residential, and it contains the major civic buildings, together with churches, chapels and associated structures, houses and associated structures, offices, banks, theatres, hotels and public houses, shops, markets and shopping arcades. The Leeds and Liverpool Canal passes through the area, and it contains three listed locks. Other listed buildings include bridges, a railway viaduct, part of a railway station, other railway buildings, hospital buildings, statues, a war memorial, and telephone kiosks.


Key

Buildings

References

Citations

Sources

 

Lists of listed buildings in West Yorkshire